Nurpur Dona  is a village in Kapurthala district of Punjab State, India. The village is administrated by a Sarpanch who is an elected representative.

Demography 
According to the report published by Census India in 2011, Nurpur Dona has total number of 246 houses and population of 1,179 of which include 613 males and 566 females. Literacy rate of Nurpur Dona is 76.35%, higher than state average of 75.84%.  The population of children under the age of 6 years is 122 which is 10.35% of total population of Nurpur Dona, and child sex ratio is approximately 1033, higher than state average of 846.

As per census 2011, 417 people were engaged in work activities out of the total population of Nurpur Dona which includes 323 males and 94 females. According to census survey report 2011, 82.01% workers describe their work as main work and 17.99% workers are involved in Marginal activity providing livelihood for less than 6 months.

Population data

Caste  
The village has schedule caste (SC) constitutes 93.38% of total population of the village and it doesn't have any Schedule Tribe (ST) population.

Air travel connectivity 
The closest airport to the village is Sri Guru Ram Dass Jee International Airport.

Villages in Kapurthala

References

External links
  Villages in Kapurthala
 Kapurthala Villages List

Villages in Kapurthala district